Kellaki is a village in the Limassol District of Cyprus, located 10 km north of Parekklisia.

References

Communities in Limassol District